Edilberto Rivera Nabus (born February 12, 1967), professionally known as Ambet Nabus, is a Filipino radio anchor, comedian, film publicist, editor, video blogger and a part-time actor.

Education
Nabus graduated with BA Communication (Broadcast Communication) from University of the Philippines Diliman in Quezon City.

Career
Nabus started his career as a Publicist in PPL Building, United Nations Avenue, Ermita, City of Manila. He likes writing press releases and other promotional thrusts, media placement, monitoring media releases, media contacts coordination, and liaises special events/tasks (i.e. red carpet premieres. press junkets, etc.)

At DZMM, Nabus formerly anchored the former Saturday showbiz program Showbiz Extra, the former entertainment program Talakan or Talakayan at Katinyawan with Ahwel Paz, and Chismax: Chismis to the Max with Gretchen Fullido.

In September 2011, Nabus was the Editor-in-Chief in CMAS Philippines International Diving & Advocacy Magazine to print photos, do write-ups, write stories, etc.

In January 2015, Nabus worked as the Entertainment Editor in Kabayan Weekly, Dubai, United Arab Emirates.

On May 29, 2020, Nabus opened his official YouTube Channel.

Filmography

Movies
Mano Po 5: Gua Ai Di (2006) - Reporter
Desperadas (2007) - Alexis' Class Adviser
Heavenly Touch (2009) - Client
Ang Panday (2009) - Miling's Son

Radio
Showbiz Extra (2006–2013) (DZMM) - Himself/Anchor
Talakan: Talakayan at Katinyawan (2007–2011) (DZMM) - Himself/Anchor
Chismax: Chismis to the Max (2009–2020) (DZMM) - Himself/Anchor

Television
Melason (ABS-CBN/Studio 23) (2010) - Himself

As a Publicist
Films:
My Monster Mom (2008) - Publicist (GMA Films)
I.T.A.L.Y.: I Trust and Love You (2008) - Publicist
Rosario (2010) - Publicity and Promotions Head

References

External links

1967 births
Living people
Tagalog people
Filipino television presenters
Filipino male comedians
ABS-CBN personalities
People from Camarines Norte
Filipino radio journalists
20th-century Filipino LGBT people
21st-century Filipino LGBT people
Filipino gay men
Filipino non-binary people
Filipino LGBT comedians
University of the Philippines Diliman alumni
Gay comedians
Non-binary comedians